The Interstellar Mapping and Acceleration Probe (IMAP) is a heliophysics mission that will simultaneously investigate two important and coupled science topics in the heliosphere: the acceleration of energetic particles and interaction of the solar wind with the local interstellar medium. These science topics are coupled because particles accelerated in the inner heliosphere play crucial roles in the outer heliospheric interaction. In 2018, NASA selected a team led by David J. McComas of Princeton University to implement the mission, which is currently planned to launch in February 2025. IMAP will be a Sun-tracking spin-stabilized satellite in orbit about the Sun–Earth L1 Lagrange point with a science payload of ten instruments. IMAP will also continuously broadcast real-time in-situ data that can be used for space weather prediction.

It is the fifth mission selected in the Solar Terrestrial Probes program, after TIMED, Hinode, STEREO and MMS.

Science 
Acceleration of charged particles up to high energy is ubiquitous throughout the universe, occurring at stars, magnetospheres, black holes, neutron stars, supernova remnants, and other locations. The precise processes behind this acceleration are not well understood. There are intermediate suprathermal particles which have energies between the energetic particles and the bulk thermal plasma. Understanding how these particles are energized and form the seed population of the energetic particles is one of the science topics that IMAP will investigate.

The solar wind and its associated magnetic field have blown a bubble in interstellar space called the heliosphere. IMAP will study the heliosphere boundary where the solar wind collides with material from the rest of the galaxy. Using Energetic Neutral Atoms (ENAs), IMAP will image this interaction region from the inner Solar System. In addition, IMAP will also directly measure the neutral particles of the interstellar medium, because they flow through the heliosphere relatively unmodified.

IMAP's science goals are based on the four science objectives specified in the IMAP Announcement of Opportunity (from the outside in):
 Improve understanding of the composition and properties of the local interstellar medium (LISM).
 Advance understanding of the temporal and spatial evolution of the boundary region in which the solar wind and the interstellar medium interact.
 Identify and advance the understanding of processes related to the interactions of the magnetic field of the Sun and the LISM.
 Identify and advance understanding of particle injection and acceleration processes near the Sun, in the heliosphere and heliosheath.

Mission

Profile 
The spacecraft will then use on-board propulsion to insert into an approximately 10° x 5° Lissajous orbit around L1, very similar to the orbit of Advanced Composition Explorer (ACE). The baseline mission is 3 years, but all expendables are designed for a lifetime of more than 5 years.

Spacecraft 
IMAP is a simple spin-stabilized (~4 RPM) spacecraft with ten instruments. Daily attitude maneuvers will be used to keep the spin axis and top deck (with solar arrays) pointed in the direction of the incoming solar wind, which is a few degrees away from the Sun. In the L1 Lissajous orbit, the rear deck, with its communication antenna, approximately points at the Earth.

Instruments 

The ten instruments on IMAP can be grouped into three categories: 1) Energetic neutral atom detectors (IMAP-Lo, IMAP-Hi, and IMAP-Ultra); 2) Charged particle detectors (SWAPI, SWE, CoDICE, and HIT); and 3) Other coordinated measurements (MAG, IDEX, GLOWS).

Shown here (top panel) are oxygen fluences measured at 1 AU by several instruments onboard Advanced Composition Explorer (ACE) during a 3-year period, with representative particle spectra obtained for gradual and impulsive Solar Energetic Particles (SEPs), corotating interaction regions (CIRs), Anomalous Cosmic Rays (ACRs), and Galactic Cosmic Rays (GCRs), and (top
panel inset) ion fluxes in the Voyager 1 direction using in situ observations from Voyager and remote ENA observations from Cassini–Huygens and Interstellar Boundary Explorer (IBEX). (Middle panel) SWAPI, CoDICE, and HIT provide comprehensive composition, energy, and angular distributions for all major solar wind species (core and halo), interstellar and inner source pick-up ions, suprathermal, energetic, and accelerated ions from SEPs, interplanetary shocks, as well as ACRs. SWE, CoDICE and HIT also provide energy and angular distributions of the solar wind ion and electron core, halo, strahl, as well as energetic and relativistic electrons up to 1 MeV.

IMAP-Lo 
IMAP-Lo is a single-pixel neutral atom imager that gives energy and angle-resolved measurements of ISN atoms (H, He, O, Ne, and D) tracked over >180° in ecliptic longitude and energy resolved global maps of ENA H and O. IMAP-Lo has heritage from the IBEX-Lo on IBEX but provides much larger collection power.

IMAP-Hi 
IMAP-Hi consists of two identical, single-pixel high energy ENA Imagers that measure H, He, and heavier ENAs from the outer heliosphere. Each IMAP-Hi Imager is very similar in design to the IBEX-Hi ENA Imager but incorporate key modifications that enable substantially improved resolution, spectral range, and collection power. The instrument also incorporates a time-of-flight (TOF) system for identification of ENA species.

IMAP-Ultra 
The IMAP-Ultra instrument images the emission of ENAs produced in the heliosheath and beyond, primarily in H atoms between ~3 and 300 keV, but it is also sensitive to contributions from He and O. Ultra is nearly identical to the Jupiter Energetic Neutral Imager (JENI), in development for flight on the European Space Agency's Jupiter Icy Moon Explorer (JUICE) mission to Jupiter and Ganymede. Ultra's primary differences from JENI are the use of two identical copies, one mounted perpendicular to the IMAP spin axis (Ultra90) and one mounted at 45° from the anti-sunward spin axis (Ultra45) for better sky coverage, and the use of slightly thicker, UV-filtering foils covering the back plane MCPs to reduce backgrounds associated with interstellar Lyman-α photons.

Solar Wind and Pick-up Ion (SWAPI) 
The Solar Wind and Pickup Ion (SWAPI) instrument measures solar wind H+ and He++ and interstellar He+ and H+ pick-up ions (PUIs). SWAPI is nearly identical to the New Horizons Solar Wind Around Pluto (SWAP) instrument. SWAPI is a simplification of SWAP, and by removal of SWAP's retarding potential analyzer, significantly increases transmission and improves sensitivity, further enhancing PUI observations.

Solar Wind Electron (SWE) 
The Solar Wind Electron (SWE) instrument measures the 3D distribution of solar wind thermal and suprathermal electrons from 1 eV to 5 keV. SWE is based on the heritage Ulysses / SWOOPS, ACE/SWEPAM and Genesis/GEM instruments, with updated electronics based on Van Allen Probes/HOPE. SWE is optimized to measure in situ solar wind electrons at L1 to provide context for the ENA measurements and perform the in situ solar wind observations necessary to understand the local structures that can affect acceleration and transport.

Compact Dual Ion Composition Experiment (CoDICE) 
The Compact Dual Ion Composition Experiment (CoDICE) measures charged particles in two separate energy ranges in a compact, combined instrument. CoDICELo is an electrostatic analyzer with a time-of-flight versus energy (TOF/E) subsystem to measure the 3D velocity distribution functions (VDFs) and ionic charge state and mass composition of ~0.5–80 keV/q ions. CoDICEHi uses the common TOF/E subsystem to measure the mass composition and arrival direction of ~0.03–5 MeV/nuc ions and ~20–600 keV electrons.

High-energy Ion Telescope (HIT) 
The High-energy Ion Telescope (HIT) uses silicon solid-state detectors to measure the elemental composition, energy spectra, angular distributions, and arrival times of H to Ni ions over a species-dependent energy range from ~2 to ~40 MeV/nuc. HIT, heavily based on the Low Energy Telescope (LET) on the Solar Terrestrial Relations Observatory (STEREO), delivers full-sky coverage with a large geometry factor. A portion of the HIT viewing area is also optimized to measure 0.5 - 1.0 MeV electrons.

Magnetometer (MAG) 
The IMAP magnetometer (MAG) consists of a pair of identical triaxial fluxgate magnetometers that measure the 3D interplanetary magnetic field. Both magnetometers are mounted on a 1.8 m boom, one on the end and the other in an intermediate position. This configuration, through gradiometry, reduces the effect of spacecraft magnetic fields on the measurements of the instrument by dynamically removing the spacecraft field. The MAG are based on the Magnetospheric Multiscale Mission magnetometers.

Interstellar Dust Experiment (IDEX) 
The Interstellar Dust Experiment (IDEX) is a high-resolution dust analyzer that provides the elemental composition, speed and mass distributions of interstellar dust particles. IDEX's sensor head has a large effective target area, which allows it to collect a statistically significant number of dust impacts (> 100/year). This instrument was constructed at the Laboratory for Atmospheric and Space Physics (LASP) at the University of Colorado Boulder.

GLObal solar Wind Structure (GLOWS) 
The GLObal solar Wind Structure (GLOWS) instrument measures the heliospheric resonant backscatter glow of hydrogen (the Lyman-alpha line at ) and helium (at ). GLOWS consists of two separate detectors: LαD and HeD for the two spectral channels, with the lines of sight directed at different angles with respect to the IMAP spin axis. The Lyman-α detector (LαD) is almost identical to LαD on the NASA TWINS mission, and HeD uses a new monochromator unit.

Communications 
Nominally, IMAP will have two 4-hour contacts per week through the NASA Deep Space Network (DSN). This is sufficient to upload any commands, download the week's worth of science data and housekeeping, and perform spacecraft ranging required for navigation. DSN will communicate with the IMAP Mission Operation Center (MOC) at Johns Hopkins University Applied Physics Laboratory, which will operate the spacecraft. All science and ancillary data will pass through the MOC to the Science Operations Center (SOC) at LASP. The IMAP SOC at LASP will be responsible for all aspects of instrument operations: planning, commanding, health and status monitoring, anomaly response, and sustaining engineering for the instruments. The SOC will also handle science data processing (including data calibration, validation and preliminary analysis), distribution, archiving, and maintaining the IMAP data management plan. Science data will be produced centrally using algorithms, software, and calibration data provided and managed by each instrument team.

All science and other data will be shared with the heliophysics community as rapidly as practical with an open data policy compliant with the NASA Heliophysics Science Data Management Policy. The NASA Space Physics Data Facility (SPDF) is the final archive for IMAP, with regular transfer of data to the SPDF so that the data can be made available through their Coordinated Data Analysis Web (CDAWeb) site.

Space weather data 
IMAP will supply critical real-time space weather data through its "IMAP Active Link for Real-Time" or I-ALiRT. IMAP will continuously broadcast a small subset (500 bit/s) of the science data for I-ALiRT to supporting ground stations around the world when not in contact with the DSN. During DSN tracks, the flight system includes the space weather data in the full-rate science data stream, which the MOC receives from the DSN and forwards to the SOC. In either case, the SOC processes these real-time observations to create the data products required by the space weather community. Data include all of the important parameters currently provided by Advanced Composition Explorer (ACE), but at significantly higher cadence, and also include several new key parameters.

Management 
This is the fifth mission in NASA's Solar Terrestrial Probes program. The Heliophysics Program Office at NASA's Goddard Space Flight Center in Greenbelt, Maryland, manages the STP program for the agency's Heliophysics Science Division in Washington, D.C.

The mission's principal investigator is David J. McComas of Princeton University. The Johns Hopkins University's Applied Physics Laboratory in Laurel, Maryland, will provide project management.

The mission is cost-capped at US$564 million, excluding cost for the launch on a SpaceX Falcon 9 launch vehicle from Cape Canaveral Space Launch Complex 40 (SLC-40) at Cape Canaveral Space Force Station (CCSFS) in Florida. As of April 2020, the preliminary total cost of the mission is estimated to be US$707.7 million to US$776.3 million.

Missions of Opportunity 
NASA plans on including an EELV Secondary Payload Adapter (ESPA) (Evolved expendable launch vehicle) Grande ring below the IMAP spacecraft, which will give the opportunity for 4 or 5 secondary payloads to ride along with the IMAP launch. Deployment of the secondary payloads will occur after IMAP deployment into a transfer orbit to the Earth-Sun L1 Lagrange point. Some of the slots may be used by other divisions in the Science Mission Directorate and some may be used by other government agencies. Two opportunities for slots were competed for the Heliophysics Science Division as part of the Third Stand Alone Missions of Opportunity Notice (SALMON-3) Program Element Appendix (PEA), with proposals for both due on 30 November 2018. Selection for Phase A studies should be announced in 2019.

Science opportunity 
The Announcement of Opportunity for the 2018 Heliophysics Science Missions of Opportunity (MoO) included the option of proposing a Small Complete Mission (SCM) to utilize the IMAP ESPA Grande to launch a secondary payload. Up to two ports on the ESPA Grande ring may be allocated for Science MoOs. The payloads are designated as Class D as defined in NPR 8705.4.

TechDemo opportunity 
The Announcement of Opportunity for the 2018 Heliophysics Technology Demonstration (TechDemo) Missions of Opportunity requested SCM proposals for spaceflight demonstration of innovative medium Technology Readiness Level (TRL) technologies that enable significant advances in NASA's Heliophysics Science Objectives and Goals. TechDemo investigations must be proposed for flight as a secondary payload with the IMAP mission. Up to two ports on the ESPA Grande ring may be allocated for TechDemo. The payloads are designated as Class D as defined in NPR 8705.4. Down-selection is targeted for the third quarter FY 2020.

See also 

 Interstellar Boundary Explorer - The IBEX spacecraft, launched in October 2008
 Advanced Composition Explorer - The ACE spacecraft, launched in August 1997
 Voyager 1 - The Voyager 1 spacecraft, launched in September 1977
 Heliophysics Science Division - NASA science division in the Science Mission Directorate

References

External links 
  - Official Princeton IMAP site
 ACE Home  - Official Caltech ACE site
 IMAP Quick Facts  - University of Colorado, Boulder IMAP page
 Heliophysics - Official NASA Heliophysics webpage

NASA space probes
Solar space observatories
2025 in spaceflight